Allocasuarina diminuta, commonly known as the broombush sheoak, is a shrub of the genus Allocasuarina native to an area in eastern New South Wales.

It is found in heath, low open woodlands, ridges and hillsides. It flowers in Autumn and Winter from about March to August and later forms small wooden fruits. It is usually part of the understorey in heath, dry sclerophyll forest and sometimes open woodlands. The species grows in low-nutrient sandy or rocky skeletal soils derived from sandstone.

References

diminuta
Flora of New South Wales
Fagales of Australia
Plants described in 1989